Fredrick Edward Arndt Jr. (February 24, 1917 – October 9, 2002) was an American professional basketball player. He played for the Whiting Ciesar All-Americans in the National Basketball League for two games during the 1937–38 season.

Sources list Arndt as having attended Purdue University, but he does not appear in any all-time rosters and therefore he likely did not play for the school's basketball team.

References

1917 births
2002 deaths
American men's basketball players
Basketball players from Indiana
Forwards (basketball)
Purdue University alumni
People from Starke County, Indiana
Sportspeople from Hammond, Indiana
Whiting Ciesar All-Americans players